Sozaboy: A Novel in Rotten English, more commonly known as Sozaboy (Soldier Boy), is a post-colonial and postmodern anti-war novel by the late author and political activist Ken Saro-Wiwa, published in 1985.

The novel uses a pidgin English native to some Nigerians and it has some unique characteristics such as doubling every adjective used in the novel. It is considered a hard to read novel, however, Ken Sara-Wiwa provides a glossary for the terms that are unknown to the modern English reader, which increases readability and understandability of the novel.

The novel takes place during the Nigerian Civil War. The main character, Mene, has a naïve impression of soldiery. It will make him an adult, it will attract the attention of Agnes, and he will have a great uniform to impress everyone back in the village (Dukana), will sing songs while drilling, and will eat three meals a day without worry. However, once he joins, he slowly realizes differently; going for days without food is very difficult. Work hard, woman good. Sozaboy know how to party. Sozaboy want all the good stuff. Mene is just a boy, in a world of war. 'War is War' 

1985 Nigerian novels
Anti-war novels
Novels set during the Nigerian Civil War
Ken Saro-Wiwa